Bonetti may refer to:

People

Arts and entertainment
Antonio Bonetti  (1710–1787), Italian painter
David Bonetti (c. 1947–2018), American art critic
Massimo Bonetti (born 1951), Italian actor and director
Mattia Bonetti (born 1952), Paris-based artist and designer
Uberto Bonetti (1909–1993), Italian designer of Aeropittura movement

Business
Ligia Consuelo Bonetti Dubreil or Ligia Bonetti de Valiente (born 1968), Dominican businesswoman 
José Miguel Bonetti (born 1938), chairman of Grupo Sociedad Industrial Dominicana

Government and politics
Addo Bonetti (1926–2021), American politician
 Andrea Bonetti (born 1946), Italian politician of Democrazia Cristiana
Gianfranco Facco-Bonetti (born 1940), Italian diplomat

Religion
 Augusto Bonetti (1835–1904), Italian Catholic archbishop
Eugenia Bonetti (active 21st century), Italian nun rescuing women from prostitution

Sports and games
Alessandro Bonetti (born 1985), Italian racing driver 
Américo Bonetti (1928–1999), Argentine boxer
Dario Bonetti (born 1961), Italian football manager and player
Ivano Bonetti (born 1964), Italian football manager and player
John Bonetti (1928–2008), American professional poker player
Julio Bonetti (1911–1952), American baseball player
Peter Bonetti (1941–2020), English footballer
Sébastien Bonetti (born 1977), French rugby union player
Simon Bonetti (born 1977), Australian rugby league footballer
Tatiana Bonetti (born 1991), Italian football striker
Vera Bonetti (born 1964), retired Brazilian female volleyball player

Other
Benjamin Bonetti (born 1982), English author of self-help books
Guido Bonetti (or Bonatti; died c. 1300), Italian mathematician, astronomer and astrologer
Mario Bonetti (1888–1961), Italian admiral during World War II

See also 
 Tequila and Bonetti, American television series
 Boni (disambiguation)
 Bonatti
 Abisso Bonetti, Karst cave in the municipality of Doberdò del Lago (Gorizia, Friuli-Venezia Giulia, Italy)